Oroblemites dromioides is a species of beetle in the family Carabidae, the only species in the genus Oroblemites.

References

Trechinae